Klein Cain High School is a senior high school in unincorporated Harris County, Texas. A part of the Klein Independent School District, it opened in August 2017. Nicole Patin is the principal of the school. The sports team is the Hurricanes. Klein Cain opened in 2017 with 9th and 10th grade students, then added 11th graders in 2018 and 12th graders in 2019. The school is named after Jim Cain, who worked in Klein ISD for 35 years and in public education for 47 years.

Campus
The campus, on an  has a capacity of 3,500 students. The campus, with three gymnasiums, a natatorium facility, career and vocational areas, and a dance area, has classrooms designed for student group work, using "L" shapes.

History 
The plans about building a new high school date back to funds that were linked with Klein ISD's 2008 and 2015 bond programs. The school was opened up for the first time in August of 2017.

2021 shooting threat 
On December 8, 2021, a student made violent threats against the school on social media, prompting school officials and the local authorities to launch an investigation. The student was later identified and expelled with the district pursuing charges. This led to the prohibition of the use of backpacks on campus until the end of the fall semester.

Attendance boundary
Areas that were rezoned to Klein Cain include portions of the Klein Oak High School zone that were north of Texas State Highway 99 (Grand Parkway) as well as rural communities along Doerre Road, areas north of Spring Cypress Road and west of Stuebner Airline Road, and the subdivisions of Vistas of Klein Lake, Laurel Glen, and Laurel Park.

Demographics
For the 2020-21 school year, there were 3,777 students enrolled in grades 9–12. The ethnic distribution of students was:
 0.3% American Indian/Alaska Native
 10.1% Asian
 13.4% Black
 38% Hispanic
 0.2% Native Hawaiian/Pacific Islander
 35.2% White
 2.7% Two or More Races
34.6% of students were eligible for free or reduced-price lunch.

Academics
For the 2021-22 school year, the school received a B grade from the Texas Education Agency, with an overall score of 81 out of 100. The school received a B grade in two domains, School Progress (score of 82) and Student Achievement (score of 81), and a C grade in Closing the Gaps (score of 79). The school received one of the seven possible distinction designations for Academic Achievement in Top 25% Comparative Academic Growth.

References

External links
 Klein Cain High School
 Klein Cain Live
 High school boundary map for 2017-2018

High schools in Harris County, Texas
Klein Independent School District high schools
Public high schools in Texas
2017 establishments in Texas
Educational institutions established in 2017